Punxsutawney Phil is the name given to a groundhog residing in Young Township near Punxsutawney, Pennsylvania, who is the central figure in Punxsutawney's annual Groundhog Day celebration.

Folklore 
On February 2 each year, Punxsutawney holds a civic festival with music and food. According to the tradition, if Phil sees his shadow and returns to his hole, he has predicted six more weeks of winter-like weather. If Phil does not see his shadow, he has predicted an "early spring." Punxsutawney's event is the most famous of many Groundhog Day festivals held in the United States and Canada. The event formally began in 1887, although its roots go back even further.

The event is based upon a communal light-hearted suspension of disbelief. It is organized by the "Inner Circle" – recognizable from their top hats and tuxedos – who ostensibly communicate with Phil to receive his prognostication. This suspension of disbelief extends to the assertion that the same groundhog has been making predictions since the 19th century.

The vice president of the Inner Circle prepares two scrolls in advance of the actual ceremony, one proclaiming six more weeks of winter and one proclaiming an early spring. At daybreak on February 2, Punxsutawney Phil awakens from his burrow on Gobbler's Knob, is helped to the top of the stump by his handlers, and purportedly explains to the president of the Inner Circle, in a language known as "Groundhogese", whether he has seen his shadow. The president of the Inner Circle, the only person able to understand Groundhogese through his possession of an ancient acacia wood cane, then interprets Phil's message, and directs the vice president to read the proper scroll to the crowd gathered on Gobbler's Knob and the masses of "phaithphil phollowers" tuned in to live broadcasts around the world.

The Inner Circle scripts the Groundhog Day ceremonies in advance, with the Inner Circle deciding beforehand whether Phil will see his shadow. The Stormfax Almanac has made note of the weather conditions on each Groundhog Day since 1999; the almanac has recorded 12 incidents in a 20-year span in which the Inner Circle said the groundhog saw his shadow while the sky was cloudy or there was rain or snow coming down, and in one case said the groundhog did not see his shadow despite sunshine.

Punxsutawney Phil canon 
The practices and lore of Punxsutawney Phil's predictions are predicated on a light-hearted suspension of disbelief by those involved. According to the lore, there is only one Phil, and all other groundhogs are impostors. It is claimed that this one groundhog has lived to make weather prognostications since 1886, sustained by drinks of "groundhog punch" or "elixir of life" administered at the annual Groundhog Picnic in the fall. The lifespan of a groundhog in the wild is roughly six years.

According to the Groundhog Club, Phil, after the prediction, speaks to the club president in the language of 'Groundhogese', which supposedly only the current president can understand, and then his prediction is translated and revealed to all.

The Groundhog Day celebration is rooted in a Celtic and Germanic tradition that says that if a hibernating animal casts a shadow on February 2, the pagan holiday of Imbolc, known among Christians as Candlemas, winter and cold weather will last another six weeks. If no shadow is seen, legend says, spring will come early. In Germany, the tradition evolved into a myth that if the sun came out on Candlemas, a hedgehog would cast its shadow, predicting snow all the way into May. When German immigrants settled in Pennsylvania, they transferred the tradition onto local fauna, replacing hedgehogs with groundhogs. Several other towns in the region hold similar Groundhog Day events.

Phil first received his name in 1961. The origins of the name are unclear, but speculation suggests that it may have been indirectly named after Prince Philip, Duke of Edinburgh.

Reception 

Prior to 1993, the Groundhog Day event in Punxsutawney attracted crowds of approximately 2,000. The popularity of the film Groundhog Day brought significantly more attention to the event, with annual crowds rising to 10,000–20,000. A notable exception was 2021, where the event took place without any crowds due to the COVID-19 pandemic. The event is streamed online each year.

People for the Ethical Treatment of Animals object to the event, claiming that Phil is put under stress. They suggest replacing Phil with a robotic groundhog.

In some cases where Phil's prognostications have been incorrect, organizations have jokingly made legal threats against the groundhog. Such tongue-in-cheek actions have been made by a prosecutor in Ohio, the sheriff's office of Monroe County, Pennsylvania, and the Merrimack, New Hampshire Police Department.

In media and popular culture 

 Phil and the town of Punxsutawney were portrayed in the 1993 film Groundhog Day. The actual town used to portray Punxsutawney in the film is Woodstock, Illinois.
 In Groundhog Day, the 2016 Broadway musical adaptation of the film, Phil is ascribed a more mythical role.
 In 1995, Phil flew to Chicago for a guest appearance on The Oprah Winfrey Show, which aired on Groundhog Day, February 2, 1995.
 A 2002 episode of the children's animated series Stanley, titled "Searching for Spring", featured Punxsutawney Phil.
 Phil was the main attraction in "Groundhog Day", the April 10, 2005 episode of the MTV series Viva La Bam. In the episode, street skater Bam Margera holds a downhill race in honor of Punxsutawney Phil at Bear Creek Mountain Resort in Macungie, Pennsylvania.
 The Pennsylvania Lottery's mascot is a groundhog named Gus, referred to in commercials as "the second most famous groundhog in Pennsylvania", in deference to Phil. Because the Groundhog Club Inner Circle has copyrighted the use of the name "Punxsutawney Phil", no commercial entity may use the name without the permission from the Inner Circle, which does not allow commercialization of the name.

Past predictions

Predictive accuracy 
The Inner Circle, in keeping with the suspension of disbelief, claims a 100% accuracy rate, and an approximately 80% accuracy rate in recorded predictions. They claim that whenever the prediction is wrong, the person in charge of translating the message must have made a mistake in their interpretation. Impartial estimates place the groundhog's accuracy between 35% and 41%.

See also 
Balzac Billy, the official groundhog of Balzac, Alberta, Canada
Buckeye Chuck, the official groundhog of Marion, Ohio, United States
Fred la Marmotte, the official groundhog of Val-d'Espoir, Quebec, Canada
Milltown Mel, the official groundhog of Milltown, New Jersey, United States
General Beauregard Lee, the official groundhog of Jackson, Georgia, United States (and by extension, the entire Southern US)
Gus the Groundhog, mascot of the Pennsylvania Lottery
Lady Edwina of Essex, replaced Essex Ed at the Turtle Back Zoo in West Orange, New Jersey, United States
Shubenacadie Sam, the official groundhog of Shubenacadie, Nova Scotia, Canada 
Staten Island Chuck, the official groundhog of New York City, New York, United States
Stormy Marmot, the official groundhog of Aurora, Colorado, United States.  Stormy is a yellow-bellied marmot.
Wiarton Willie, the official groundhog of Wiarton, Ontario, Canada

References

Further reading

External links 
Gobbler's Knobb Tradition 
Groundhog.org. the official site of the Punxsutawney Groundhog Club.
The Oddities of Groundhog Day. Onward State.
Visiting Phil at Punxsutawney Library

Individual groundhogs
Holiday characters
Oracular animals
Pennsylvania culture
Individual animals in the United States
Groundhog Day